Trevor Morris Lyman (born 1970) is an American musician and internet music entrepreneur. Lyman popularized such political campaign concepts as moneybombs and dedicated political blimp advertising. He helped organize grassroots fundraising for 2008 United States Republican presidential candidate Ron Paul, Congressman from Texas by offering to create a hub website after supporters of the candidate decided a "money bomb" would be an effective way to bring in campaign donations.

Music career
In 1988, Lyman was a member of the band The Demand with Dave Jamrog, Dave Newton, and Dan O'Neil, and produced and recorded a first album, according to Jamrog. Lyman later began the Music Submit promotion company, which for four years has enabled artists to bypass major record labels and to market their songs directly via the internet; he created and operates its website. The organization, currently co-owned by Lyman, promotes musicians via radio, music magazines, indie labels, and internet marketing such as blogs, directories, and podcasts. Lyman moved from Merrimack, New Hampshire, to South Florida in 2006.

Political activism
Lyman had never voted or contributed to any political candidate before or worked on any campaign, but he felt betrayed by the new Democratic-majority Congress in 2006 when it did not end the war in Iraq. He became a supporter of U.S. Congressman Ron Paul when Paul was exploring a presidential run in early 2007. Lyman was impressed by Paul's promise to withdraw troops from Iraq, and noted that hundreds of Myspace users were converting their personal profiles into Paul profiles. He described himself as "mostly apathetic" about politics, but later quoted a grassroots slogan: "Dr. Paul cured my apathy."

Lyman was not affiliated with Paul's official campaign and had never met Paul. Paul's campaign admits not knowing much about Lyman beyond his grassroots organization efforts, although Paul and Lyman have spoken by phone and, according to the NH Insider blog, met briefly on December 1, 2007.

Liberty Crier and other websites
Lyman organized a website for posting videos of and for Paul's meetup groups in July 2007. The website's tagline is "Televising the Revolution".

Moneybombs

In October 2007, while monitoring Paul's appearances in YouTube videos, Lyman discovered a video from James Sugra of California, who advocated a massive one-day fundraiser from Paul's supporters on November 5, 2007.

Lyman commented, "There's no officialness about it in any sense. It’s just a website that said, 'Hey, let's all donate money on this day' .... Once the banners were in place and people could start spreading links, it just propagated virally."

Ron Paul blimp

With the assistance of former Federal Elections Commission chair Brad Smith (now a campaign finance lawyer), Lyman and other supporters established a for-profit company to collect donations for a blimp to advertise Paul's message. The innovative funding structure was created to permit donors to escape federal limits of $2,300 per person on the amounts donated. Instead of being directed to a candidate's primary campaign committee, donations pay for advertising for the candidate as determined by the for-profit corporation, Liberty Political Advertising, L.L.C. The FEC has not commented on the validity of such a finance structure.

With a stated cost of $400,000 per month, supporters raised enough money to keep the blimp afloat for about six weeks. Piloted by Dick Schwenker, it flew over Walt Disney World for several days, as well as the January 10 presidential debate in Myrtle Beach, South Carolina. In 2007–08, the blimp has been sighted flying over:
Elizabeth City, NC, December 14
Baltimore, MD, December 20
Jacksonville, FL, December 28
Orlando, FL, January 1–3
Gainesville, FL, January 6–7
Myrtle Beach, SC, January 10–11
Sumter, SC, January 18
New Smyrna Beach, FL, January 25–26

New Hampshire move
Lyman moved to Manchester, New Hampshire, in mid-November 2007 in connection with the Free State Project and efforts to campaign for Paul in the early-primary state. However, Lyman had also stated his move was "not to work on the campaign [but] just because he went to college there and said it would be a better place than Miami to raise a family." Until the January 8 primary, he roomed with several other Paul supporters in a self-described "frat house" with seven bedrooms.

Lyman became the 500th "liberty-loving" participant to move to New Hampshire on behalf of the Free State Project; its members move to the state to work locally to reduce the size and scope of government. One of Lyman's first tasks was to field constant media queries from such sources as XM Satellite Radio, the Christian Science Monitor, the Chicago Tribune, and CNN.

Basic Media
In February 2008 Lyman announced the formation of Basic Media, a media company intended to advance liberty principles independent of any campaign, by developing high-quality radio and TV internet broadcasting and marketing it to the mainstream American audience. Lyman partnered with Rick Williams, a practicing lawyer and 1973 graduate of UCLA School of Law. Lyman's new website issued a Section 254 initial solicitation of interest for an initial public offering of stock. Basic Media reached an agreement for its planned cable channel, "Break the Matrix TV", to be carried by Bay Country Communications, an SCTE cable provider which serves Cambridge, Maryland, and Dorchester County.

Awards and recognition
Renew America, though it is a grassroots organization chaired by Paul's competitor Alan Keyes, nevertheless named Lyman its Man of the Year for 2007.

The "incredibly successful" November 5 moneybomb was awarded a Golden Dot as "Technology Impact Moment of the Year" at the 2008 Politics Online Conference.

Personal details
Lyman was born in 1970 and attended high school in Merrimack, New Hampshire, where he was also a member of The Demand. He did not complete college.

References

Internet activists
People associated with the 2008 United States presidential election
Living people
1970 births